{{DISPLAYTITLE:C5H4N2O3}}
The molecular formula C5H4N2O3 (molar mass: 140.10 g/mol, exact mass: 140.0222 u) may refer to:

 5-Formyluracil
 4-Nitropyridine-N-oxide